San Ferdinando is a southern district of Naples, with a population of about 18,000.

Overview
San Ferdinando district includes, among the various landmarks, the Royal Palace, Piazza del Plebiscito (the most celebrated square of Naples),  the San Carlo opera house and the church of San Ferdinando, from which the district is named.

History
The district began to develop during the 16th century, when the Spanish built a first Viceroy's palace, then replaced by the new Royal Palace of Naples by Domenico Fontana. In the following decades, the district became the most desired area of Naples by the city aristocracy because of its proximity to the court, and subsequently many villas and palaces were edified there.

Quartieri of Naples